Jānis Cimze (3 July/21 June 1814 — 22 October/10 October 1881) was a Latvian pedagogue, collector and harmoniser of folk songs, organist, founder of Latvian choral music and initiator of professional Latvian music. He is buried at the Lugaži Cemetery.

Early life 
Cimze was born at the Rauna Manor's Cimze dairy farm (hoflage) in the family of a manor's dairy farm overseer Andreas (Ansis) Cimze and his wife Anne as the first child of 8 for his parents. His initial education came from Rauna Parish School where he also learned to play the organ. From the age of sixteen he worked as a private tutor; later he was a teacher at Valmiera Parish School and an organist.

Education 
In 1836 Cimze went to Germany to study at Weissenfels Teachers' Seminary which he finished in 1838. This was where he learned to play the violin and piano and improved his skills as an organist. In 1838—39 he was an external student at Berlin University where he attended lectures on mathematics, didactics and the theory of music. His music professor was Ludwig Christian Erk, a collector, harmoniser, publisher and researcher of German folk songs.

Vidzeme Teachers' Seminary 
Upon returning from Germany, from 1839 and to the end of his life, Cimze headed Vidzeme Teachers' Seminary where he taught future teachers the conducting of choirs and harmonisation of folk songs. Cimze followed the principles of Johann Pestalozzi and Adolph Diesterweg and all education was conducted in German.

During his forty-two years of work at the Teachers' Seminary Cimze educated more than four hundred students who subsequently became Latvian and Estonian teachers. Being a teacher in the 19th century meant being also an educator, a musician, a literary and public figure. In the second half of the 19th century teachers organised choirs and worked with them and cultural societies.

Musical legacy 

Jānis Cimze promoted the development of Latvian choral singing and the cultivation of a cappella performance. His collection of songs for choirs "Dziesmu rota" (A Garland of Songs) was published in eight parts in 1872–84. This first ever professional collection of songs for choirs in Latvia formed the foundation of Latvian choir culture. Parts II (1872), III (1874), IV (1875) and VII (1884) of "Dziesmu rota", which go under the title of "Lauku puķes" (Wild Flowers), are the first collections of Latvian folk songs arrangements and represent a number of folk song genres: songs of seasons and family customs, work songs, farewell songs of recruits and conscripts, songs of orphans as well as songs for games and lullabies.

Jānis Cimze was the first prominent Latvian figure in music, whose example inspired extensive collection, publishing, arrangement and research of folk music. It fostered the development of the choir-singing movement and the creation of new original compositions.
Thanks to the activities of Cimze and his students, the first All-Estonian (1869) and All-Latvian (1873) Song Festivals were held. Cimze was among those who conceived the idea of the event, while his student and associate Indriķis Zīle was one of the chief conductors at the Song Festival. The programme of the Song Festival included several arrangements of folk songs by Cimze and his brother Dāvid. Cimze's German sentiments surfaced as he compared the three brothers making the dowry-chest for their sister in the song "Rīga dimd" (Riga resounds) to the German nobility, the Lutheran Church and the German Riga. For this he was severely criticised by Atis Kronvalds.

References

Sources

External links 

 Jānis Cimze at the Latvian Music Information Center

1814 births
1881 deaths
People from Smiltene Municipality
People from Kreis Wenden
Latvian composers
Latvian educators
Latvian musicians
Latvian folk music
Composers from the Russian Empire
Educators from the Russian Empire
Musicians from the Russian Empire
19th-century composers
19th-century Latvian educators
19th-century Latvian people